"It's Unbelievable" was a hit for Philadelphia doo wop group The Larks in 1961. It became very popular in Philly as well as become a hit in the pop charts.

Background
The chance to record the song came about as a result of Weldon McDougal running into Atlantic Records promo man Jerry Ross. After the auditioning for Ross, the Larks recorded around six tracks. In 1961, "It's Unbelievable" was released on the Sheryl label in 1961. The group appeared on American Bandstand to sing their song courtesy of Jerry Ross arranging their appearance.

Backing group
The group that played on the recording were called The Manhattans. They consisted of drummer Norman Conners, sax player Harrison Scott, guitarist Johnny Stiles,  and keyboardist Ruben Wright.  Wright was formerly with Philadelphia group The Capris and had written their hit God Only Knows.

Chart performance
In 1961, the song peaked at No. 69 on the Billboard pop chart.

Releases

References

1961 singles
1961 songs